Theoklitos Farmakidis (born Theoharis Farmakidis; ; 1784–1860) was a Greek scholar and journalist. He was a notable figure of the Modern Greek Enlightenment.

Biography
He was born in 1784 in Nibegler (Νιμπεγλέρ) near Larissa, in the Thessaly region of northern Greece. He studied at the Phanar Greek Orthodox College and the Princely Academy of Iași. After Anthimos Gazis he continued the publishing of Hermes o Logios with his partner Konstantinos Kokkinakis. He joined the Philiki Etaireia and became an admirer of Adamantios Korais, supporter of Greek independence and critic of the Ecumenical Patriarchate of Constantinople.

Greek Revolution
After the outbreak of the Greek War of Independence, he approached Dimitrios Ypsilantis. In August 1821, in Kalamata he started publishing the Greek newspaper Elliniki Salpinx ("Greek Bugle"). He took part at the National Assemblies of Epidaurus and Astros and later he taught in the Ionian Academy (1823-1825).

Thought
He was a supporter of the English party and Alexandros Mavrokordatos. During the reign of Otto, he was advisor on ecclesiastical/religious matters and supporter of the establishment of the Church of Greece. He was liberal and tolerant to the different dogmas and became friend with Jonas King, the controversial Protestant missionary in Greece.

A strongly pro-West supporter, he was against the Greek involvement in the Crimean War.

Selected works
 Elements of the Greek language, Athens, 1815
 Apology, Athens, 1840
 The Synodal Tome or About the Truth, Athens, 1852

Sources
 Βγένα Α. Βαρθολομαίου, Η δίκη του Θεόκλητου Φαρμακίδη (1829-1839), Μνήμων 4 (1974), σελ. 172–214.

1784 births
1860 deaths
19th-century Greek philosophers
Greek theologians
Greek scholars
Greek people of the Greek War of Independence
People of the Modern Greek Enlightenment
Members of the Filiki Eteria
Greek Eastern Orthodox priests
19th-century Eastern Orthodox priests
Enlightenment philosophers
Age of Enlightenment
People from Larissa (regional unit)